Michałów Land is a historical region in central Poland, now part of the Kuyavian-Pomeranian Voivodship. During the Middle Ages, it was a disputed territory between the Kingdom of Poland and the State of the Teutonic Order.

Name
It was named after Castle Michelau/Michałowo (it is part of the city of Brodnica (Strasburg), which was destroyed well before 1789).

Geography
From a geographical perspective, it was sometimes also considered part of Kulmerland, although it is east of the river Drwęca (Drewenz). The land of Michałowo and Lubawa (Löbau) were part of Prussian territory in direct vicinity of the Kulmerland.

History
Conquered in the 11th century a territory named Masovia developed as borderland between the Prussians and Masovians, who at a time of the fragmentation of Poland had made themselves independent of the Polish rulers. The small territories of Michelau and Löbau were bouncing back and force in between.

The rulers of Kujavia and Masovia had given lands to the monk and apostle of the Prussians, Christian of Oliva, He was declared first bishop of Prussia by the pope and he also bought additional territories. A Prussian chieftain had given bishop Christian his land Löbau, by accepting Christianisation at Rome.

In 1303 the Teutonic Order state received the territory as lien and in 1317 they bought it and received all rights from the Duke of Kujavia. Over the next few centuries, as Masovia was reabsorbed into the Kingdom of Poland, the Michelauer land became one of the territories often contested between Poland and the Order. After the Second Peace of Toruń it was incorporated into Poland, as part of the Chełmno Voivodeship.

The area is mentioned in the Treaty of Lake Melno.

See also 
 Dobrzyń Land

External links 
  1500s Map of Old Prussian Land  (Altpreussen) with Culmerland, Sassen, Galindia (Michelau and Löbau) Michelauer Land and Lobovia on the Border to Masovia to the south of Prussia, before arrival of Teutonic Knights

Kuyavian-Pomeranian Voivodeship
Historical regions in Poland